After Here Through Midland is the second album by Cock Robin and was released in 1987.

Again it was a big success in continental Europe as their first eponymous album, reaching the Top 10, but was largely ignored in the United States where the album reached only #166 in the Billboard 200. The single "Just Around the Corner" proved to be the biggest hit in Europe, and it remains a staple on adult contemporary and pop music stations in France.

Track listing

All songs by Peter Kingsbery, except "Blood is a Saint" written by Anna LaCazio and Clive Wright.

Musicians

Cock Robin 
 Peter Kingsbery: Lead vocals, keyboards, bass, synthesizer programming
 Anna LaCazio: lead vocals

Additional musicians 
 Tod Yvega, Mark Binder: Synclavier operators
 Tod Yvega, Mark Binder, Richard Gibbs: synthesizer programmers
 Tim Pierce: guitars
 Denny Fongheiser: drums, percussion
 Dennis Herring: acoustic guitar on "The Biggest Fool Of All"
 Brian Kilgore: conga on "Precious Dreams"

Misc 
Produced by Don Gehman

Singles:
 Just Around the Corner
 The Biggest Fool of All
 El Norte

Charts

Weekly charts

Year-end charts

Certifications

References 

Cock Robin (band) albums
1987 albums
Columbia Records albums
Albums produced by Don Gehman